This is a list of defunct hotel chains. This list also includes defunct motel chains.

Defunct hotel chains

 Adam's Mark 
 Admiral Benbow Inn
 Alamo Plaza Hotel Courts
 AmeriHost Inn 
 AmeriSuites
 Crest Hotels
 Cross Country Inn – defunct American motel chain
 Denizen Hotels – defunct brand of Hilton Hotels
 Esso Motor Hotel 
 Exel Inn 
 Forte Group
 Fred Harvey Company 
 Gran Dorado
 Hiway House – defunct American motel chain
 Horne's
 Imperial 400 – defunct American motel chain
 Jack Tar Hotels
 Nickelodeon Resorts by Marriott 
 Norsk Spisevognselskap
 Parliament House Motor Inn
 Patio Hotels 
 Ramada Jarvis 
 The Real Hotel Company
 Rica Hotels – purchased by Scandic Hotels in 2014
 Royal Inns of America
 Shoney's Inn – defunct American motel chain
 Stakis Hotels 
 Statler Hotels 
 Summerfield Suites
 Susse Chalet 
 Tage Inn
 Trusthouse Forte
 United Hotels Company of America
 Van Noy Railway News and Hotel Company

See also

 List of chained-brand hotels
 List of hotels in the United States
 List of largest hotels in the world
 Lists of hotels – an index of hotel list articles on Wikipedia

References

Lists of hotels
Lists of defunct companies